The Cambodia national women's cricket team is the team that represents Cambodia in international women's cricket. In April 2018, the International Cricket Council (ICC) granted full Women's Twenty20 International (WT20I) status to all its members. Cambodia was admitted as a member of the ICC in July 2022. Therefore, all Twenty20 matches played between Cambodia women and other ICC members since that date are eligible for full WT20I status.

The Cambodia women's team made its international debut in December 2022, with a 6-match WT20I series at home against the Philippines, winning 5 of the 6 matches. In January 2023, the Cricket Federation of Cambodia announced on their Facebook page that they would host a 5-match WT20I series against Singapore the following month.

Records and statistics 
International Match Summary — Cambodia Women
 
Last updated 12 February 2023

Twenty20 International 
T20I record versus other nations

Records complete to WT20I #1358. Last updated 12 February 2023.

See also
 List of Cambodia women Twenty20 International cricketers

References

Cricket
Women's national cricket teams